Young Sinatra is the second mixtape by American rapper Logic. It was released on September 19, 2011, by Visionary. It has been downloaded over 750,000 times on DatPiff since its release. It was followed by Young Sinatra: Undeniable, Young Sinatra: Welcome to Forever and YSIV. The album cover features a mugshot of musician and singer Frank Sinatra at the age of 20.

Logic samples several of Frank Sinatra’s songs throughout the album.

Production 
The mixtape was produced by Logic, Black Diamond, 6ix, C Dot Castro, OB, Baum Beats, Inspired Mindz, Charli Brown Beatz, Project Marvel, and Sunny Norway.

Track listing

References

External links 
 Official site

Logic (rapper) albums
2011 mixtape albums